Les Balayeurs du désert are a French ambient post-rock band. The group is composed of Michel Augier (composition, vocals, guitar), Fatoumata Diawara (vocals), Fred Tanari (keyboards, bass, vocals), Jean Michel Bourroux (drums), Bruno Lerouzic (pipes), Gram Maby (bass), Camilla Sagues (chorus) and Marcela Paz (chorus).

Les Balayeurs du désert have released three albums, and have also accompanied the Royal de Luxe theatre company providing music for several productions.

Discography 
Chasseurs de girafes (2000)
Jules Verne Impact (2005)
Bazar musical interplanetaire (2009)
La Pequeña (2011)
Live à Guadalajara (2011)

References

External links
Official site
Comprehensive unofficial page

Musical groups established in 1997
French electronic music groups